The 1979–80 Kansas Jayhawks men's basketball team represented the University of Kansas during the 1979–80 NCAA Division I men's basketball season.

Roster
Darnell Valentine
Ricky Ross
Tony Guy
John Crawford
Douglas Booty Neal
Dave Magley
Chester Giles
Keith Douglas
Art Housey
Kelly Knight
Randolph Carroll
Mark Snow
Mac Stallcup
Mark Knight
George Thompson

Schedule

References

Kansas Jayhawks men's basketball seasons
Kansas
Kansas Jay
Kansas Jay